Werner Muff (born 25 February 1974) is a Swiss equestrian. His discipline is show jumping, either individually or as part of a team. He currently ranks 131st on the FEI Rolex Ranking List.

Biography 

Muff first began riding on his father's cavalry horse and became interested in show jumping at an early age. Per his parents' request, he attended school at Raiffeisen Bank in Beromünster between 1989 and 1992. Starting in 1993, he worked at Alois Fuchs Wängi as a heater for a year and a half. Between 1994 and 1996, his employer was Thomas Fuchs in Bietenholz, and from 1996 to 2000, he worked for Manfred Birchler in Bilten. There he won his first Grand Prix on the horse BB Cardinale and received the opportunity to ride Nation's Prices. After four years of self-employment at Thomas Fuchs's stable, he turned to self-employment in the barn of Susanne Meier. He began winning a variety of different jumping shows, mostly with the horse Plot Blue. Among others, Muff won the Swiss Cup final in 2005, 2006, and 2010. In 2006 he was also awarded "Rookie of the Year". He competed in the 2012 Summer Olympics, earning thirty-third individually and being part of the fourth-place Swiss team. In individual jumping, Muff did not advance due to a rule saying that no more than three riders from a single country could advance to the finals, and Steve Guerdat, Paul Estermann, and Pius Schweizer had already advanced for Switzerland.

Criticism 

In 2010, Muff won the equestrian Swiss Cup final in Ascona for the third time. In the final, Muff changed horses from Comanche to Escorial V, the latter a notoriously difficult horse. Pius Schwizer responded in shock, "Escorial was not to lead. Such a block cannot ride him. He was made especially for the 18-year-old Annina Züger at risk of injury." Muff responded, "The success is not really pleasure. Escorial is a sensitive horse with which my competitors had difficulties. This happens with a final stop in changing horses. Maybe some are now injured in her honor. Nothing can deport you on the horse." The next year, the practice of the Cup in a final change of horses, was abolished and replaced by a final two rounds.

Horses

References

External links 
 Official website 

Swiss male equestrians
Olympic equestrians of Switzerland
1974 births
Living people
Equestrians at the 2012 Summer Olympics
Place of birth missing (living people)
Sportspeople from the canton of Lucerne